

The Dewoitine D.560 was a prototype French single-seat fighter developed by Dewoitine as an alternate to the Dewoitine D.500. The design failed to better the performance and only one aircraft was built.

Development
To provide an alternate design in the competition to supply the French Air Force with a successor to the Nieuport 62. Rather than the low-wing monoplane design of the D.500 the D.560 had a shoulder-mounted gull wing. During test flying the D.560 was found to be slower than the D.500 and had stability problems. The aircraft was rebuilt with a parasol wing and redesignated the D.570. Performance was even worse than the gull wing design, and following a crash of the prototype development was abandoned.

Variants
D.560
Prototype gull wing fighter, one built.
D.570
The D.560 rebuilt with a parasol wing.

Specifications (D.560)

References

Notes

Bibliography

1930s French fighter aircraft
D.560
Gull-wing aircraft
Single-engined tractor aircraft
Aircraft first flown in 1932